Acanthoxyla prasina, the prickly stick insect, is a stick insect in the order Phasmatodea and the family Phasmatidae. It is found throughout New Zealand, although it is less frequently reported than "common" stick insect species. It has been introduced to Britain, predominantly Cornwall and Devon, and to the south-west region of the Republic of Ireland. It has a thorny skin, which is used as camouflage.

The species reproduces by parthenogenesis, producing eggs without the help of a male, and the population is entirely female. No male had ever been seen until 2016 when one was discovered in the introduced population in Cornwall. He was likely the result of a rare mutation and is now part of the collection at the Natural History Museum in London.

See also
 List of stick insects of New Zealand

References

External links 

 Acanthoxyla prasina discussed on RNZ Critter of the Week, 17 September 2021

Phasmatidae
Phasmatidae of New Zealand
Insects described in 1977
Endemic fauna of New Zealand
Endemic insects of New Zealand